Whipple Dam State Park is a Pennsylvania state park on  in Jackson Township, Huntingdon County, Pennsylvania in the United States. Whipple Lake is a man-made lake on  that was originally built during the height of the lumber era that swept through Pennsylvania in the late 19th and early 20th century to supply power for a sawmill.

History 
The land on which Whipple Dam State Park is located was purchased from the Iroquois Confederation in 1754 by the Proprietary Government of Pennsylvania. Eventually the Monroe Iron Works was built on the land and the production of charcoal took place, as well as the mining of iron ore. Remnants of the iron mines can be seen today at the park.

The demand for lumber reached northern Huntingdon County in the 1860s. The old-growth forests of white pine and hemlock were harvested from the mountains. Osgood M. Whipple purchased a large tract of land on which he built a sawmill that was powered by the waters of the lake formed by the dam he also constructed. Mr. Whipple left the lumber business in 1897, but the lake remained and has been used for recreation ever since (and is today known as Whipple Lake). The state of Pennsylvania purchased the land on January 15, 1904, from the Linden Hall Lumber Company, which was owned by William Whitmer and his sons. The dam was rebuilt in 1928 by the Pennsylvania Bureau of Forestry, a forerunner of the Pennsylvania Department of Conservation and Natural Resources. The land was used recreationally by the 1920s. A camp for Boy Scouts, Girl Scouts, and Campfire Girls was built on the north side of the lake in 1928 and was used until 1941.

The Great Depression of the 1930s was a boom time for the construction of state park facilities all over Pennsylvania and Whipple Dam was no exception. Unemployed young men were put to work by the Civilian Conservation Corps and cleared streams of brush, planted many acres of trees in a reforestation effort, built bridges on state roads and cleared roads through the forests for fire prevention. The CCC also built the facilities that are still in use today at Whipple Dam State Park. In 1935, they dismantled the 1928 dam and built a new one. They also built pavilions, restrooms, roads and the beach. Their work was placed on the National Register of Historic Places in 1987.

Recreation

Whipple Lake 
Whipple Lake is open to fishing, ice fishing, boating, and swimming. The lake is stocked by the Pennsylvania Fish and Boat Commission with trout.  Gas powered boats are prohibited on Whipple Lake. Electric powered boats and non powered boats must have current registration with any state. The sand beach opens on Memorial Day weekend and closes Labor Day weekend. There is no lifeguard stationed at the beach. There is a beach volleyball court, bathhouse and snack bar at the beach. The lake provides a habitat for a wide variety of waterfowl as well as great blue heron, osprey, beavers and muskrats.

Picnics 
There are three large pavilions that were built by Civilian Conservation Corps. These pavilions can be reserved up to 11 months in advance. Pavilions that are not reserved are available on a first come, first served basis. In addition to the pavilions there are many picnic tables in the forested picnic area that is near Whipple Lake.

Hunting 
Hunting is permitted within certain parts of Whipple Dam State Park.  Hunting is not permitted in the day use area.  Hunters are expected to follow the rules and regulations of the Pennsylvania State Game Commission. The common game species are ruffed grouse, squirrels, turkey, white-tailed deer, waterfowl, and black bears. The hunting of groundhogs is prohibited.

Nearby state parks 
The following state parks are within  of Whipple Dam State Park:
Bald Eagle State Park (Centre County)
Black Moshannon State Park (Centre County)
Greenwood Furnace State Park (Huntingdon County)
Canoe Creek State Park (Blair County)
Penn-Roosevelt State Park (Centre County)
Poe Paddy State Park (Centre County)
Poe Valley State Park (Centre County)
Reeds Gap State Park (Mifflin County)
Trough Creek State Park (Huntingdon County)

References

External links 

  

State parks of Pennsylvania
Park buildings and structures on the National Register of Historic Places in Pennsylvania
Protected areas established in 1928
Civilian Conservation Corps in Pennsylvania
Parks in Huntingdon County, Pennsylvania
National Register of Historic Places in Huntingdon County, Pennsylvania
Dams on the National Register of Historic Places in Pennsylvania
1928 establishments in Pennsylvania
Protected areas of Huntingdon County, Pennsylvania